The 2018 OFC Women's Nations Cup was the 11th edition of the OFC Women's Nations Cup (also known as the OFC Women's Championship), the quadrennial international football championship organised by the Oceania Football Confederation (OFC) for the women's national teams of the Oceanian region. The tournament was held in New Caledonia between 18 November – 1 December 2018.

The tournament served as the Oceanian qualifiers to the 2019 FIFA Women's World Cup, with the champions qualifying for the World Cup in France. The champions also qualified for the 2020 Summer Olympics women's football tournament in Japan.

New Zealand were the defending champions. They won the tournament for their fourth consecutive and sixth overall OFC Women's Nations Cup title.

Format
The format was as follows:
Qualifying stage: The four lowest-ranked teams based on previous regional performances of all women's national teams (American Samoa, Solomon Islands, Vanuatu and Fiji) entered the qualifying stage, which was be held from 24 to 30 August 2018 in Fiji (originally scheduled to be held in American Samoa). The winner qualified for the final tournament, joining the other seven teams which automatically qualified.
Final tournament: A total of eight teams played in the final tournament, which was held between 18 November to 1 December 2018 in New Caledonia. For the group stage, they are divided into two groups of four teams. The top two teams of each group advance to the knockout stage (semi-finals and final) to decide the winner of the OFC Women's Nations Cup that qualify for the FIFA Women's World Cup as well as the Olympic football tournament.

The draw for the tournament was held on 21 March 2018 at the OFC Headquarters in Auckland, New Zealand. In both the qualifying stage and final tournament, the hosts (Fiji and New Caledonia) were assigned to position A1 in the draw, while the remaining teams were drawn into the other positions without any seeding.

Tiebreakers
The ranking of teams is determined as follows:

 Points obtained in all qualifying matches;
 Goal difference in all qualifying matches;
 Number of goals scored in all qualifying matches;
 Points obtained in the matches played between the teams in question;
 Goal difference in the matches played between the teams in question;
 Number of goals scored in the matches played between the teams in question;
 Fair play points in all qualifying matches (only one deduction can be applied to a player in a single match): 
 Coin toss or drawing of lots.

Qualification

For the first time, the OFC Women's Nations Cup is a compulsory tournament, so all 11 OFC member national teams have entered the tournament.

Note: New Caledonia and Tahiti are not members of the International Olympic Committee and thus not eligible to qualify for the Olympic Football Tournament.

Venues
The host nation of the final tournament was New Caledonia. The matches were played at four venues.

Squads

Each team can name a maximum of 23 players.

Group stage
The top two teams of each group advance to the semi-finals.

All times are local, NCT (UTC+11).

Group A

Group B

Knockout stage

Bracket

Semi-finals

Third place match

Final
Winners qualified for the 2019 FIFA Women's World Cup and 2020 Summer Olympics.

Goalscorers

Awards
The Golden Ball Award was awarded to the most outstanding player of the tournament. The Golden Boot Award was awarded to the top scorer of the tournament. The Golden Glove Award was awarded to the best goalkeeper of the tournament. The Fair Play Award was awarded to the team with the best disciplinary record at the tournament.

Qualification for international tournaments

Qualified teams for FIFA Women's World Cup
The following team from OFC qualified for the 2019 FIFA Women's World Cup.

1 Bold indicates champions for that year. Italic indicates hosts for that year.

Qualified teams for Summer Olympics
The following team from OFC qualified for the 2020 Summer Olympic women's football tournament.

1 Bold indicates champions for that year. Italic indicates hosts for that year.

References

External links
OFC Women's Nations Cup, oceaniafootball.com
News > 2018 OFC Women's Nations Cup, oceaniafootball.com

 
Women's Nations Cup
2018
2018 in women's association football
2019 FIFA Women's World Cup qualification
International association football competitions hosted by New Caledonia
November 2018 sports events in Oceania
December 2018 sports events in Oceania
Football at the 2020 Summer Olympics – Women's qualification
2018 in New Caledonian sport
New Zealand at the 2019 FIFA Women's World Cup